During the afternoon of 9 June 2020, a massacre occurred in a village in Gubio Local Government Area of Borno State, northeastern Nigeria. A group of gunmen on motorcycles and other vehicles attacked the village for over two hours, killing at least 81 people. Thirteen other people were injured in the attack, and seven others abducted. The attackers also killed over 300 cows and stole another 1,000. An Air Force fighter jet fired shots at the insurgents as they left. The insurgents returned the following morning, killing a herdsman who escaped the massacre, then set fire to the village. No group claimed responsibility, but suspicion fell on the jihadist group Boko Haram.

On the same day, a 200-strong gang attacked Kadisau, a village in Katsina State. They looted it, killing at least 20 people who tried to defend it. No group claimed responsibility.

References

2020 murders in Nigeria
2020s in Borno State
2020s massacres in Nigeria
Arson in Nigeria
Arson in the 2020s
Boko Haram attacks in Borno State
Boko Haram kidnappings
Islamic terrorist incidents in 2020
June 2020 crimes in Africa
Mass kidnappings of the 2020s
Mass murder in Borno State
Massacres in 2020
Massacres perpetrated by Boko Haram
Robberies in Nigeria
Terrorist incidents in Nigeria in 2020